Survivor: Cambodia — Second Chance is the 31st season of the American CBS competitive reality television series Survivor. Unlike previous seasons, which were completely cast by producers, this season featured 20 returning contestants chosen by an online public vote. The ballot, with the 32 finalists that were considered for this season, was revealed on May 6, 2015, the same day that voting began. The final cast was revealed on May 20, at the reunion of the preceding season. After the reveal occurred, the chosen cast members immediately began the trip to Koh Rong, Cambodia, where the season was filmed. The season premiered on September 23, 2015 and concluded on December 16, 2015 when Jeremy Collins was declared the winner over Spencer Bledsoe and Latasha "Tasha" Fox in a unanimous 10–0–0 jury vote.

It is the tenth season to feature returning players, and the third to feature a cast consisting entirely of returning players, after Survivor: All-Stars and Survivor: Heroes vs. Villains. Though this season was the 31st to air, it was the 32nd to film, after the subsequently-aired Survivor: Kaôh Rōng; the two seasons were filmed back-to-back in the same location.

This season featured several new alterations to the game format. Hidden immunity idols, typically hidden either at tribal camps or Exile Island, were hidden this season at immunity challenges before the merge. Additionally, this season marked the first time the number of regular tribes increased over the course of a season (in this case, from two to three), and the first time the tribes merged with 13 players remaining. It also introduced the vote stealer, in which one player could prohibit another from voting and cast a second ballot in their stead.

Casting
According to host and executive producer Jeff Probst, 75 former contestants were initially considered regarding on returning for this season. On Twitter and in an interview with Entertainment Weekly, Probst revealed that Greg Buis from Survivor: Borneo, Ian Rosenberger from Survivor: Palau, Shannon "Shambo" Waters from Survivor: Samoa, Roberta "R.C." Saint-Amour and Jeff Kent from Survivor: Philippines were contacted to return but all of them declined the offers. Josh Canfield, Reed Kelly, and Jon Misch from Survivor: San Juan del Sur were all contacted, however Canfield and Kelly's Broadway contracts prevented them from being able to play, and Misch missed the call.

Public vote
The vote was conducted on the CBS website, and was open to residents of the U.S., Canada (where the show is simulcast on Global), and Australia (where the show airs the following day on Go!). On the website, each candidate was featured in a video displaying a series of clips from their original season followed by a plea to voters as to why they should be selected for Cambodia. Registered voters were required to submit ballots of exactly ten men and ten women, and each voter could only submit a ballot once every 24 hours. This public voting process was similar to one CBS used in 2006 for the first all-star edition of reality program Big Brother.

Voting commenced on May 6, 2015, while the Worlds Apart season of Survivor was still in progress. The ballot consisted entirely of players who had played only once before and had not won; however, two of the candidates from Worlds Apart (Mike Holloway and Carolyn Rivera) had not yet been eliminated from that season when voting began; if either of them were revealed to be that season's winner, they would be deemed ineligible for Cambodia and, if they were among the top ten vote receivers of their gender, their spot would be given to the person on their ballot with the 11th highest vote total. Holloway won Worlds Apart and per Jeff Probst's announcement had finished in the top 10 among male candidates, so the 11th place male candidate joined the cast instead. Probst has since stated that, out of respect for the contestants, there is no intention to reveal the final vote counts or ranks.

Contestants
The cast is composed of 20 returning players initially split into two tribes. On day 7, the tribes were shuffled from two to three. The three tribes are named after Cambodian temples: Ta Keo, Bayon, and Angkor. The merged tribe name Orkun is the Khmer word for "thank you", which was suggested by contestant Kimmi Kappenberg.

Future appearances
Ciera Eastin and Jeff Varner returned for Survivor: Game Changers. Joe Anglim and Kelley Wentworth returned for Survivor: Edge of Extinction. Jeremy Collins returned to compete on Survivor: Winners at War.

Outside of Survivor, Yung "Woo" Hwang, Wentworth, Collins, and Anglim competed on the premiere of Candy Crush. Abi-Maria Gomes competed with two-time Survivor contestant Sierra Dawn Thomas on a Survivor vs Big Brother episode of Fear Factor. In 2022, Tasha Fox competed on The Challenge: USA.

Season summary
The 20 returning castaways were initially divided into two tribes of ten: Bayon and Ta Keo. Bayon was led by a core alliance spearheaded by Andrew and Jeremy, the entire tribe promising to stay loyal in the face of upcoming tribe swaps. Throughout the two tribe shuffles, the original Ta Keo tribe fractured while most original Bayon members continued acting in the interest of reforming at the merge. However, some—such as Ciera and Kass—were not as loyal, creating a new alliance on the second Ta Keo tribe. On the third Ta Keo tribe, Ciera and Kass's new alliance came into conflict with Andrew, and they blindsided his ally Woo. 

The tribes merged the next day with 13 players remaining, setting Andrew and Jeremy's reformed Bayon alliance against Ciera and Kass's. Though the Bayon alliance initially held the majority, the tribe's large size and multitude of intertwining relationships as a result of the tribe swaps caused the players to eschew long-term alliances in favor of creating temporary voting blocs to get rid of common threats. 

While the voting bloc strategy prevailed well into the merge, stable alliances began to form as the numbers dwindled. With seven players remaining, Jeremy formed a majority alliance with Spencer, who had had no consistent allies throughout the game, and original Bayon members Kimmi and Tasha. However, Kimmi later betrayed them to align with outsiders Keith and Kelley. Kimmi was eliminated after the ensuing deadlock tie, and Jeremy, Spencer, and Tasha reached the end of the game together. Ultimately, at the Final Tribal Council, Jeremy was rewarded for his strategic and social dominance throughout the entire game, earning the title of Sole Survivor by a unanimous jury vote.

Episodes

Voting history

Notes

Reception

Ratings
The premiere episode was watched by 9.70 million viewers and received a 2.5/8 rating/share in the critical 18–49 demographic. Though the ratings were down from the San Juan del Sur premiere the year before, it ranked first in its timeslot and third for the night, behind Empire and Modern Family. Including three-day DVR figures, the premiere was watched by a total of 11.4 million viewers and scored a 3.1 18–49 rating. The first and second episodes were consistent with the average ratings of the last seven seasons of the show (from One World to Worlds Apart), which averaged 11.5 million viewers and 18–49 ratings between 3.1 and 3.5.

U.S. Nielsen ratings

Live + SD ratings

DVR ratings

Canadian ratings

Critical reception
The season received extremely positive reviews. Daniel Fienberg of The Hollywood Reporter reviewed the season positively, saying "The episodes this fall were a reminder of why this show works so well and why you can never rule out Survivor to produce twists and turns that rival what you might find on a Netflix or HBO drama." Dan Heaton of Rob Has a Website gave the finale—and the season—a favorable review, saying, "This week's very satisfying finale included one of the show's greatest Tribal Councils and barely took a breath in the rush to the finish. Three different players won immunity, tears were shed, and no one backed down. There were no horrible gaffes at the Final Tribal Council, and the jury mostly avoided the bitter route. Kimmi emerged from a quiet edit to nearly dethrone the champ while Keith remained his unique self. Spencer and Tasha made a strategic error by sticking with Jeremy, but both showed real determination throughout the season to make the end. To put it mildly, I enjoyed this season."
Dalton Ross of Entertainment Weekly ranked Cambodia as his sixth-favorite season, only behind Borneo, Micronesia, Heroes vs. Villains, Cagayan, and David vs. Goliath. He stated that despite some confusion with the season's constantly-shifting "voting blocs" and his disappointment with some of the challenges, he found the season appealing due to "how hard the bulk of the cast was playing," while also praising the numerous twists such as the fan-vote, the idols hidden in challenges, the tribe swaps, and the vote-stealing advantage. Caroline Framke of Vox raved the season, saying "The high level of game play in Survivor: Second Chance made a 15-year-old formula feel new again." In 2020, "Purple Rock Podcast" ranked this season 4th out of 40 saying that "the cast is an obvious strength. The gameplay is great as well, with ever-shifting strategies as players jostle for position to make the most of their second shot at the game." Later that same year, Inside Survivor ranked this season 16th out of 40 saying that "what really makes a season is the cast. And best believe this cast plays hard. Voting blocs, alliances, immunity idols, and vote steals, no obstacle is too great for these players who have everything to prove to their fans and themselves." In 2021, Rob Has a Podcast ranked Cambodia 9th during their Survivor All-Time Top 40 Rankings podcast.

Controversy
On December 15, the day before the live reunion show, one of the season's castaways, Vytas Baskauskas, announced on Twitter that he had been banned from participating in the reunion, simply for leaving Cambodia early following his elimination. Baskauskas was the first person voted out of the game, but rather than remain sequestered from the public for the duration of filming, per the show's protocol, he chose to return to the United States early to be with his infant son. According to Inquisitr, when fans of Survivor read about his ban, many of them were irate that he was being excluded from the reunion show. However, one fan in particular claimed that Baskauskas had committed breach of contract with CBS, by making a post on Instagram during the time period in which the season was filming, thus revealing that he was indeed out of the game at the time and, therefore, potentially spoiling part of the outcome of the season.

Baskauskas defended himself by stating that the social media post in question wasn't a spoiler, since an assistant of his, with access to his Instagram account, was the one who had made that post on his behalf. Baskauskas further claimed that he couldn't have been on social media during that time, since he hadn't even gotten his phone back yet. He also pointed out that there is nothing in the Survivor contract that says that a player's social media account cannot be run by a third party.

Nonetheless, the reunion show went on without Baskauskas, nor was there any on-air acknowledgement of his absence.

References

External links
 Official CBS Survivor website

2015 in Cambodia
Television shows filmed in Cambodia
2015 American television seasons
31
Television controversies in the United States